John Thomas Jackson (21 December 1876–1954) was an English footballer who played in the Football League for Blackburn Rovers and Glossop.

References

1876 births
1954 deaths
English footballers
Association football forwards
English Football League players
Padiham F.C. players
Blackburn Rovers F.C. players
Chorley F.C. players
Glossop North End A.F.C. players